Katarina Barun Šušnjar (born 1 December 1983) is a Croatian volleyball player. She plays as opposite.

She competed at the 2015 Women's European Volleyball Championship, and 2017 Women's European Volleyball Championship.

She played for Lokomotiv Baku, 
Igor Gorgonzola Novara, 
Liu Jo Nordmeccanica Modena,
and Saitama Ageo Medics.

References 

1983 births
Living people
Croatian women's volleyball players
Expatriate volleyball players in Italy